Denis Kudla defeated Daniel Altmaier in the final, 2–6, 6–2, 6–3, to win the singles tennis title at the 2022 Arizona Tennis Classic. It marked Kudla's eighth career ATP Challenger title.

Matteo Berrettini was the defending champion, but did not return to defend his title.

Seeds

Draw

Finals

Top half

Bottom half

References

External links
Main draw
Qualifying draw

Arizona Tennis Classic - 1